Claire Callender OBE is a British academic, Professor of Higher Education Studies, UCL Institute of Education, University of London, since 2010, and Deputy Director of the Centre for Global Higher Education (CGHE).

Callender researches on student finance, an issues including the "effects of tuition debt on graduate financial and life decisions".

In 2017, she received an OBE.

Selected books
 Hunt, S., Callender, C., and Parry, G. (2016) The entry and experience of private providers of higher education in six countries, Centre for Global Higher Education, UCL Institute of Education.
 Temple, P., Callender, C., Grove, L., and  Kersh, N. (2014) Managing the student experience in a shifting higher education landscape, York: The Higher Education Academy
 Callender, C., Hawkins, E., Jackson, S., Jamieson, A., Land, H., and Smith, H.(2014) ‘Walking tall’: A critical assessment of new ways of involving student mothers in higher education London: Nuffield Foundation
 Callender, C. and Scott, P. (eds)  (2013) Browne and beyond: Modernizing English Higher Education, London: Institute of Education Press, Bedford Way Papers.
 Heller, D and Callender, C (eds) (2013) Student Financing of Higher Education: A Comparative Perspective, International Studies in Higher Education Routledge, London
 Callender, C and Wilkinson, D (2013) Futuretrack: Part-Time Higher Education Students Two Years After Graduating – The Impact of Learning Manchester: HECSU.

References

Living people
Officers of the Order of the British Empire
Year of birth missing (living people)